"Live at Newcastle" (a.k.a. "Live in Newcastle") is a live album by the Damned, released in 1983.

The album was recorded at Newcastle's Mayfair rock club, and features material from the band's albums up to and including Strawberries, which was released in the month this was recorded (October 1982). Some tracks (on the full version of the album) are chants, and Captain Sensible's number 1 track from 1982, "Happy Talk", is also performed.

Personnel
The Damned
Dave Vanian  - vocals
Captain Sensible - guitar, vocals
Paul Gray - bass guitar
Roman Jugg - keyboards, vocals
Rat Scabies - drums

Track listing

Full version
 "Ignite"
 "Disco Man"
 "Generals"
 "I Just Can't Be Happy Today"
 "Stranger on the Town"
 "Wait for the Blackout"
 "Bad Time for Bonzo"
 "Curtain Call"
 "Dozen Girls"
 "Limit Club"
 "Melody Lee"
 "Fuse"
 "Love Song"
 "Sensible's a Wanker"
 "Smash It Up"
 "Looking at You"
 "New Rose"
 "Happy Talk"
 "Noise Noise Noise"
 "Hippy Hippy Shake"
 "Citadel (cut)"

Short version
 "Ignite"
 "Disco Man"
 "Generals"
 "Bad Time for Bonzo"
 "Dozen Girls"
 "Love Song"
 "Smash It Up (part 1)"
 "Smash It Up (part 2)"
 "Looking At You"
 "New Rose"

References

External links
 Official Damned website
 [ "Live at Newcastle" on the All Music Guide]

The Damned (band) albums
The Damned (band) live albums
1983 live albums